The Faculty of Law, Political Science and Criminology of the University of Liège is a faculty of the University of Liège located in Liège, Belgium. Founded in 1816 as one of the state university's four original faculties, it brings together the departments of law, of political science, and the Jean Constant Liège School of Criminology.

The current dean of the faculty is Professor Yves-Henri Leleu.

History 
The history of the Faculty of Law begins with that of the University of Liège itself on 25 September 1816. The Faculty of Law is, together with the Faculties of Medicine, Science and Philosophy, one of the four original faculties founded at the time of the creation of the University.

Initially located in the city-center of Liège, the faculty moved to the Sart Tilman campus during the 1980s, like most departments of the university.

Building & architecture 
The Faculty of Law building, designed by architect Claude Strebelle and inaugurated in 1981, is located at 7 boulevard du Rectorat within the Sart Tilman campus.

Programmes

Department of Law

Bachelor degrees 

 Bachelor in law

Master degrees 

 Master in law, with specialized studies in
 private law (Belgian, European and international aspects)
 public and administrative law (Belgian, European and international aspects)
 corporate law (Belgian, European and international aspects)
 social law (Belgian, European and international aspects)
 criminal law (Belgian, European and international aspects)
 inter-university mobility (Erasmus+ or other mobility)
 management and management-law (this master degree gives access to HEC Liège Management School's Master in management sciences in one year)

Advanced master degrees 

 Advanced master in European law, competition law and intellectual property law (bilingual French-English)
 Advanced master in tax law
 Advanced master in notary law

Doctoral degrees

 Doctorate (PhD) in legal studies

Department of Political Science

Bachelor degrees 

 Bachelor in political science

Master degrees 

 Master in political science (1 year programme)
 Master in political science, with specialized studies in
 European Policies
 European policies and Euro-Mediterranean relations (double degree with the University of Catania)
 Public Administration
 International relations
 Science, Technology and Society (double degree with Maastricht University)

Doctoral degrees

 Doctorate (PhD) in Political and Social Sciences

Jean Constant Liège School of Criminology

Master degrees 

 Master in criminology, with specialized studies
 Master in criminology, with advanced studies

Doctoral degrees

 Doctorate (PhD) in Criminology

Research institute and centres 
Researchers are part of the Governance, Justice and Society Research Unit, abbreviated Cité.

Research centers include:

 French-speaking Belgian Association for Town and Country Planning Law
 Inter-University Centre for Notarial Law (CIDN), with UCLouvain
 Chronicles of Law for the Use of Justices of the Peace and Police Officers
 Notarial Chronicles
 Royal Commission on Law and Business (CrDVA)
 University-Palais Commission (CUP), with UCLouvain
 Fernand Dehousse Institute for European Legal Studies (IEJE)
 Institute for Business Dispute Resolution (IBDR)
 Liege Competition and Innovation Institute (LCII)
 Tax Institute

Notably faculty and alumni

Professors 

 Fernand Dehousse
 Renaud Dehousse
 Melchior Wathelet Sr.

Alumni 

 Henri de Brouckère (1801-1891), politician, former Prime Minister of Belgium
 Christine Defraigne (1962-), politician, regional member of parliament and senator
 Willy Demeyer (1959-), politician, Mayor of Liège
 Édouard Ducpétiaux (1804-1868), journalist
 Walthère Frère-Orban (1812-1896), politician, former Prime Minister of Belgium
 Jean Gol (1942-1995), politician
 Pierre Harmel (1911-2009), politician, former Prime Minister of Belgium
 Joseph Lebeau (1794-1865), politician, former Prime Minister of Belgium
 Edmond Leburton (1915-1997), politician, former Prime Minister of Belgium
 Charles Magnette (1863-1937), politician, former Speaker of the Senate
 Jules Malou (1810-1886), politician, former Prime Minister of Belgium
 Jean-Claude Marcourt (1956-), politician, minister and president of the Walloon Parliament
 Jean-Baptiste Nothomb (1805-1881), politician, former Prime Minister of Belgium
 Laurette Onkelinx (1958-), politician, federal minister
 Didier Reynders (1958), politician, federal minister
 Charles Rogier (1800-1885), politician, former Prime Minister of Belgium

Publications 
The Faculty publishes the Journal of the Faculty of Law of the University of Liège, formerly known as Annales de la faculté de droit, and later Actualités du droit.

References

Universities in Belgium